A reflow oven is a machine used primarily for reflow soldering of surface mount electronic components to printed circuit boards (PCBs). 

In commercial high-volume use, reflow ovens take the form of a long tunnel containing a conveyor belt along which PCBs travel. For prototyping or hobbyist use PCBs can be placed in a small oven with a door.

Commercial conveyorised reflow ovens contain multiple individually heated zones, which can be individually controlled for temperature. PCBs being processed travel through the oven and through each zone at a controlled rate. Technicians adjust the conveyor speed and zone temperatures to achieve a known time and temperature profile. The profile in use may vary depending on the requirements of the PCBs being processed at the time.

Types of reflow ovens

Infrared and convection ovens 

In infrared reflow ovens, the heat source is normally ceramic infrared heaters above and below the conveyor, which transfer heat to the PCBs by means of radiation. 

Convection ovens heat air in chambers, using that air to transfer heat to the PCBs by means of convection and conduction. They may be fan assisted to control the airflow within the oven. This indirect heating using air allows more accurate temperature control than directly heating PCBs by infrared radiation, as PCBs and components vary in infrared absorptance.

Ovens may use a combination of infrared radiative heating and convection heating, and would then be known as 'infrared convection' ovens.

Some ovens are designed to reflow PCBs in an oxygen-free atmosphere. Nitrogen (N2) is a common gas used for this purpose. This minimizes oxidation of the surfaces to be soldered. The nitrogen reflow oven takes a few minutes to reduce Oxygen concentration to acceptable levels within the chamber. Thus nitrogen ovens typically have nitrogen injection in at all times which decreases defect rates.

Vapour phase oven 

The heating of the PCBs is sourced by thermal energy emitted by the phase transition of a heat transfer liquid (e. g. PFPE) condensing on the PCBs. The liquid used is chosen with a desired boiling point in mind to suit the solder alloy to be reflowed.

Some advantages of vapour phase soldering are:
 High energy efficiency due to the high heat transfer coefficient of vapour phase media
 Soldering is oxygen-free. There is no need for any protective gas (e.g. nitrogen)
 No overheating of assemblies. The maximum temperature assemblies can reach is limited by the boiling point of the medium.

This is also known as condensation soldering.

Thermal profiling
Thermal profiling is the act of measuring several points on a circuit board to determine the thermal excursion it takes through the soldering process.
In the electronics manufacturing industry, SPC (statistical process control) helps determine if the process is in control, measured against the reflow parameters defined by the soldering technologies and component requirements.

See also
 Reflow soldering
 Thermal profiling

References and further reading

General references

 

Printed circuit board manufacturing